Protoporphyrinogen IX  is an organic chemical compound which is produced along the synthesis of porphyrins, a class of critical biochemicals that include hemoglobin and chlorophyll. It is a direct precursor of protoporphyrin IX.

The compound is a porphyrinogen, meaning that it has a non-aromatic hexahydroporphine core, which will be oxidized to a porphine core in later stages of the heme synthesis.  Like most porphyrinogens, it is colorless.

Biosynthesis
The compound is synthesized in most organisms from coproporphyrinogen III by the enzyme coproporphyrinogen oxidase:

The process entails conversion of two of four propionic acid groups to vinyl groups. In coproporphyrinogen III, the substituents on the pyrrole rings have the arrangement MP-MP-MP-PM, where M and P are methyl and propionic acid, respectively.  In protoporphyrinogen IX, the sequence becomes MV-MV-MP-PM, where V is vinyl.

By the action of protoporphyrinogen oxidase, protoporphyrinogen IX is later converted into protoporphyrin IX, the first colored tetrapyrrole in the biosynthesis of hemes.

References

See also
 Protoporphyrinogen oxidase

Macrocycles
Tetrapyrroles